Yumaklı can refer to:

 Yumaklı, Çerkeş
 Yumaklı, Yenipazar